Best of Enemies is a 1933 American pre-Code comedy film directed by Rian James and written by Sam Mintz and Rian James. The film stars Charles "Buddy" Rogers, Marian Nixon, Frank Morgan, Greta Nissen, Joseph Cawthorn and Arno Frey. The film was released on June 23, 1933, by Fox Film Corporation.

Cast 
Charles "Buddy" Rogers as Jimmie Hartman
Marian Nixon as Lena Schneider
Frank Morgan as William Hartman
Greta Nissen as The Blonde
Joseph Cawthorn as Gus Schneider
Arno Frey as Emil
W. E. Lawrence as August 
Anders Van Haden as Professor Herman

References

External links 
 

1933 films
Fox Film films
American comedy films
1933 comedy films
Films set in Germany
American black-and-white films
1930s English-language films
1930s American films